Horst is a wooded hill of Hesse, Germany. It lies in the Mittelgebirge Spessart not far from the border to Bavaria.

It is located between Bad Orb and Jossgrund in the Main-Kinzig-Kreis.

Hills of Hesse
Main-Kinzig-Kreis
Hills of the Spessart